The Lawra market is a major trading post in Lawra in Upper West Region of Ghana.

References

Retail markets in Ghana